Nenagh Ormond RFC is an Irish Rugby union club based in Nenagh, County Tipperary. It was founded in 1884 as the Ormond Cricket and Football Club. The club plays in Division 2A of the All-Ireland League and was County Tipperary's first ever senior grade rugby club. The club's main ground is New Ormond Park with another ground in Tyone where underage teams train and play.

The club fields 2 adult sides and 10 underage sides, including u13 to u20 teams which compete in North Munster competitions and Munster competitions. The club also fields a women's side and girl's underage sides.

The club joined the senior ranks in 2005 when they won the round robin and spent their first ten seasons as a senior club in the bottom division of the All Ireland League. In the 2013/2014 season, the club won Division 2B of the All Ireland League and retained the Munster Senior Plate which had been won for the first time in December 2012 with a win over Dolphin in Mahon, Cork. In 2014, Nenagh beat Young Munster by 74 points to 7 to win a third competition in the senior ranks.

Nenagh Ormond has produced three Irish full-internationals as well as several players who either played for Munster in the amateur era or played professionally for an Irish province or in England. Tony Courtney (1899-1970) with seven caps, Trevor Hogan (formerly Munster and Leinster) who won three caps made his debut against Japan in 2005 and Donnacha Ryan (Munster) who made his debut in 2008 against Argentina in Croke Park, Dublin. Ray Hogan played professionally with Connacht and David Delaney played professionally with Plymouth.

Club honours
A.I.L Division 2B - 2014
Munster Senior Plate - 2013, 2014
Limerick Charity Cup - 2017/2018
Munster Senior Club of the Year - 2014
A.I.L. Round-Robin Series - 2005 
 Munster Junior Cup (5): 1931, 1935, 1948, 2000 & 2004 
Munster Junior League, Division 1 - 2005 
Munster Junior League, Division 2 - 1999
Munster Junior Clubs Challenge Cup - 2000, 2003
Manseragh Cup 1931, 2004
Garryowen Cup 1931, 2000
Gleeson League 2000
O'Carroll Cup 2000
u20/21 O Connor Cup 2008, 2009, 2012, 2013, 2014
u20 Munster division 2 league 2009

External links
 Official Club Website

Irish rugby union teams
Rugby union clubs in County Tipperary
Rugby clubs established in 1884
Nenagh
Senior Irish rugby clubs (Munster)